Acts 17 is the seventeenth chapter of the Acts of the Apostles in the New Testament of the Christian Bible. It records the second missionary journey of Paul, together with Silas and Timothy. The book containing this chapter is anonymous, but early Christian tradition uniformly affirmed that Luke composed this book as well as the Gospel of Luke.

Text 
The original text was written in Koine Greek and is divided into 34 verses.

Textual witnesses
Some early manuscripts containing the text of this chapter are:
In Greek
Codex Vaticanus (AD 325–350)
Codex Sinaiticus (330–360)
Codex Bezae (c. 400)
Codex Alexandrinus (400–440)
Papyrus 127 (5th century; extant verses 1–10)
Codex Laudianus (c. 550)
In Latin
 Codex Laudianus (~550; complete)
León palimpsest (7th century; 1–25)

Locations

This chapter mentions the following places (in the order of appearance):
 Amphipolis
 Apollonia
 Thessalonica
 Berea
 Athens

Timeline 
The second missionary journey of Paul took place in c. AD 49.

Distances 
From Thessalonica to Berea (modern Veria) is about  westward. Paul then traveled to 'the sea', which would have been at least 42 km at the nearest point, and then south to Athens, approximately 300 km (most likely by sea, though it is possible that he walked the coastal road instead). The journey 'by night' from Thessalonica to Berea presumably took more than one night.

In Thessalonica (17:1–9)
Paul, Silas and Timothy continued the travel westward from Philippi on Via Egnatia, passing several cities before arriving at Thessalonica, which has a 'well-established Jewish community with a synagogue' (verse 1), where Paul visited for three successive sabbaths speaking about the gospel (verse 2). After an initial success among synagogue members extending to the receptive Gentile adherents (verse 4), an outbreak of 'jealousy' (or 'fundamentalist zeal': zelosantes, verse 5) occurred within 'the Jews', who took the city mob to launch an attack on Paul and Silas. When Paul and Silas could not be found, the mob took a man named "Jason", as one of Paul's followers, to the civic authorities (called politarchs in verse 6; a title attested in inscriptional evidence for Thessalonica with a charge of disturbance (verses 6–7) that Paul's teaching of "the Kingdom" (cf. Acts 28:31) was 'inherently incompatible with the personal oaths of loyalty to the emperor' as 'demanded of all inhabitants of the empire'.

In Berea (17:10–15)
Paul's mission was initially dependent on 'the networks of the Jewish diaspora', that very time he arrived in an unfamiliar city, Paul first visited a synagogue to preach the gospel among the Jewish people. The Jews in Berea were noted as "more noble" (Greek: eugenesteroi, v. 11: NRSV: "more receptive"), as they were willing to give a 'careful and open-minded examination' (Greek: anakrinontes, v. 11) of Paul's teaching, before many of them came to belief (verse 12). There is a contrast between "women of high standing and men" who believe (verse 12) and "the crowds" ('the urban proletariat'), who were agitated by the Jews of Thessalonica (verse 13).

In Athens (17:16–21)
The absence of any mention of places between Berea and Athens provides presumptive evidence that Paul indeed travel by sea, 'rounding the promontory of Sunium, entered Athens by the Piræus'. The philosophical scene (verse 18) was reminiscent of the classical period in Athens, when Socrates engaged in philosophical dialogue (Greek: dielegeto, "argued', verse 17) in the streets and agora of Athens, and the charge against Paul about proclaiming "foreign divinities" (Greek: xenon daimonion, verse 18) would remind the charge brought against Socrates of preaching "new divinities" (Greek: kaina daimonia: cf. Xenophon, Memorabilia 1.1.1–4; only here in the New Testament that daimonia has the neutral Greek sense 'divine beings' instead of 'evil spirits'). The Areopagus was the chief administrative body at that time in Athens.

Verse 18
Then certain Epicurean and Stoic philosophers encountered him. And some said, "What does this babbler want to say?"Others said, "He seems to be a proclaimer of foreign gods," because he preached to them Jesus and the resurrection.Epicureans and Stoics are from two most dominant and popular schools of philosophy in Athens at that time (more than Academics and Peripatetics) and also with the greater contrast of teachings with the doctrines of Christianity, that Paul preached ("encountered" or "in conflict with", from Greek: , ; cf. ).

Addressing the Areopagus (17:22–34)

The speech, known as the Areopagus sermon, refers to a sermon or explanation delivered by Apostle Paul at the Areopagus in Athens, and described in Acts 17:16–34.Theology of the New Testament by Udo Schnelle (2009)  p. 477 The Areopagus sermon is the most dramatic and fullest reported speech of the missionary career of Saint Paul and followed a shorter address in Lystra . Paul explained concepts such as the resurrection of the dead and salvation, in effect a prelude to the future discussions of Christology. According to the record, after the sermon, a number of people became followers of Paul. These included a woman named Damaris, and Dionysius, a member of the Areopagus. This latter has at times been suggested as Dionysius the Areopagite, but that may be a historical confusion.

Verse 28for in Him we live and move and have our being, as also some of your own poets have said, 'For we are also His offspring'. "For in Him we live and move and have our being": is quoted from Cretica (Κρητικά) by Epimenides as found by J. Rendel Harris based on a 9th-century Syriac commentary by Isho'dad of Merv on the Acts of the Apostles.
 "'For we are also His offspring'": Paul might take this quotation from two poets:
Aratus, probably of Tarsus or Soli in Cilicia (~272 BC), thus Paul's countryman. The words  ("For we too are his offspring") are found in a didactic poem titled "Phenomena''", comprising the main facts of astronomical and meteorological science at that time, starting with an invocation to Zeus.
Cleanthes (~300 BC), of Assos in Mysia, who wrote  ("For we thine offspring are") in a hymn to Zeus.

See also

 Related Bible parts: Acts 14, Acts 15, Acts 16

Notes

References

Sources

External links
 King James Bible – Wikisource
English Translation with Parallel Latin Vulgate
Online Bible at GospelHall.org (ESV, KJV, Darby, American Standard Version, Bible in Basic English)
Multiple bible versions at Bible Gateway (NKJV, NIV, NRSV etc.)

17